Jassaniyeh-ye Bozorg (also Romanized as Jassānīyeh-ye Bozorg; also known as Jassānīyeh, Loveymī, Lovīmī, and Luwaimi) is a village in Anaqcheh Rural District, in the Central District of Ahvaz County, Khuzestan Province, Iran. At the 2006 census, its population was 2,654, in 481 families.

References 

Populated places in Ahvaz County